Reza Malekzadeh (born 1952 in Kazerun, Fars province, Iran) is an Iranian medical scientist and gastroenterologist.

Career
Malekzadeh studied medicine at Shiraz University. He continued his studies to become specialized in Internal Medicine in Shiraz University where he did as well his fellowship in gastroenterology. In 1985, he joined the department of gastroenterology at Free Royal Hospital in London. After his return to Iran, he got a faculty position at Shiraz University and later on at Tehran University of Medical Sciences  where he is currently a full professor of internal medicine. He is also an Honorary Professor at University of Birmingham, UK.

Reza Malekzadeh was the Minister of Health of Iran's government from 1991-1993. From 2000-2004, Malekzadeh was the secretary of the Iranian Academy of Medical Sciences , and since 2005, the Academy's Vice-President for Research. He is the director of Digestive Disease Research Center , and was appointed as the director of Shariati Hospital  in 2007. Dr Malekzadeh is also the Deputy-Editor of Archives of Iranian Medicine .

He is working on a big cancer cohort in Bandar-Turkeman, Golestan Province of Iran to investigate the environmental and genetic causes of oesophageal cancer.

Achievements
Besides being a renowned gastroenterologist, Professor Malekzadeh has been instrumental in designing and executing an efficient and practical way of diagnosing cancerous and benign esophageal lesions in Iran, applicable to urban and rural areas. He was elected as a member of TWAS in 2004.

Reza Malekzadeh received the "Permanent Personages Award" in the Third Permanent Personages session held on October 22, 2003. This national award is given to the most outstanding and memorable citizens of Iran. He has numerous reputable scientific publications in gastroenterology and liver diseases. Dr Malekzadeh was selected as distinguished professor of Tehran University of Medical Sciences in 2008.

Views
During the COVID-19 pandemic in Iran, Supreme Leader Ali Khamenei and general Hossein Salami had suggested that the coronavirus pandemic in the country was due to a biological attack. On 13 March, Reza Malekzadeh rejected this theory.

Family life
Dr Malekzadeh was born in village baladeh in Fars. Reza Malekzadeh has been married for 31 years, and since then has had 4 children, three girls and one boy, three of which have followed his footsteps in the study of medicine and one who is currently studying architecture. He still visits Baladeh regularly and contributes massively to humanitarian work in the area.

Memberships
Member of the International Association for Study of the Liver (IASL)
Member of the American Gastroenterology Association (AGA)
Member of the European Association for Gastroenterology & Endoscopy (EAGE)
Member of the American Society for Gastrointestinal Endoscopy (ASGE)
Secretary of the Iranian Society of Gastroenterology and Hepatology
Member of the Iranian Society of Physicians
Counsellor of the Iranian Board of Internal Medicine
Permanent Member of the Iranian Academy of Medical Sciences
Member of the American Association for Advancement of Science (AAAS)

See also
Iranian science
Iranian Academy of Medical Sciences

References

External links
Digestive Disease Research Center (DDRC)
Archives of Iranian Medicine
Reza Malekzadeh's publications in pubmed

20th-century Iranian inventors
Iranian gastroenterologists
Government ministers of Iran
Shiraz University alumni
Academic staff of Shiraz University
Academic staff of the University of Tehran
1952 births
Living people
People from Kazerun
Executives of Construction Party politicians
Iranian Science and Culture Hall of Fame recipients in Medicine
Shiraz University of Medical Sciences alumni
20th-century Iranian politicians